Noyack (also Noyac) is a hamlet and census-designated place (CDP) in Suffolk County, New York, United States. The CDP population was 4,325 at the 2020 census.

Noyac is an Algonquin word meaning "a corner or point of land". It is believed that it refers to Jessup Neck, granted to John Jessup in 1679.

Noyac is located on the South Fork of Long Island in the Town of Southampton. The community is at the edge of Noyac Bay.

The William Cauldwell House was added to the National Register of Historic Places in 2009.

Geography
Noyac is located at  (40.991160, -72.334417).

Demographics

As of the census of 2000, there were 2,696 people, 1,158 households, and 716 families residing in the CDP. The population density was 383.2 per square mile (147.9/km2). There were 1,993 housing units at an average density of 283.3/sq mi (109.3/km2). The racial makeup of the CDP was 95.81% White, 0.96% African American, 0.11% Native American, 0.85% Asian, 0.04% Pacific Islander, 1.45% from other races, and 0.78% from two or more races. Hispanic or Latino of any race were 4.60% of the population.

There were 1,158 households, out of which 25.1% had children under the age of 18 living with them, 51.3% were married couples living together, 6.9% had a female householder with no husband present, and 38.1% were non-families. 30.1% of all households were made up of individuals, and 13.0% had someone living alone who was 65 years of age or older. The average household size was 2.33 and the average family size was 2.92.

In the CDP, the population was spread out, with 21.3% under the age of 18, 4.4% from 18 to 24, 27.3% from 25 to 44, 27.2% from 45 to 64, and 19.8% who were 65 years of age or older. The median age was 44 years. For every 100 females, there were 96.8 males. For every 100 females age 18 and over, there were 93.5 males.

The median income for a household in the CDP was $54,176, and the median income for a family was $66,667. Males had a median income of $53,788 versus $34,167 for females. The per capita income for the CDP was $31,956. About 2.8% of families and 3.9% of the population were below the poverty line, including 5.2% of those under age 18 and 1.9% of those age 65 or over.

References

Southampton (town), New York
Census-designated places in New York (state)
Hamlets in New York (state)
Census-designated places in Suffolk County, New York
Hamlets in Suffolk County, New York
Populated coastal places in New York (state)